The 6th Canadian Infantry Division was an infantry division of the Canadian Army, formed in 1942 during the Second World War. It was attached to Pacific Command. The division had a brigade sent to the Aleutian Islands Campaign, particularly at Kiska, but never saw action. The 6th Division was to have been part of a proposed Commonwealth Corps, formed for a planned invasion of Japan, but was disbanded in 1945, after the war was ended by the bombing of Hiroshima and Nagasaki.

History
The 6th Canadian Infantry Division was raised as part of a home-defence scheme in Canada, the culmination of various mobilizations throughout 1941 and 1942. The 6th was raised in March 1942 with its headquarters on Vancouver Island in British Columbia. Various composite units were stationed at Port Alberni, Vancouver Island and Vernon. Throughout 1943, the division lost its artillery units to coastal defence work, and other battalions were shipped overseas. In June 1943, these units were sent to Kiska only to find the island abandoned, and in late 1943, the 7th Canadian Infantry Division was disbanded and various battalions were amalgamated into the 6th. By January 1944, the units had returned from Kiska, having not taken part in any fighting. On 1 December 1944, the need for coastal defence having lessened, it was decided that the division should be disbanded.

However, planning for a proposed Allied invasion of Japan called for a Canadian division to be a component of a combined Commonwealth Corps. Disbandment of the 6th halted and it was re-formed as the main component of the Canadian Army Pacific Force, with the inclusion of units that served with other divisions.

The re-formed division was commanded by Major General Bert Hoffmeister and its primary units were named after the components of the 1st Canadian Infantry Division. However, its battalions were to be organized along the lines of a US Army infantry division and would be equipped primarily with US-made weapons, vehicles and equipment.

Following the surrender of Japan, the division's disbandment continued. The remaining units were disbanded by 31 January 1946.

Order of battle

March 1942
 Headquarters, Sixth Division 
 6th Division Intelligence Section 
 No. 6 Field Security Section 
 No. 6 Defence and Employment Platoon (Lorne Scots)
 Machine gun battalion – 1st Battalion, The Canadian Fusiliers (City of London Regiment)
 13th Canadian Infantry Brigade 
 2nd Battalion, The Canadian Scottish Regiment
 1st Battalion, The Brockville Rifles
 1st Battalion, The Edmonton Fusiliers
 No. 13 Defence Platoon (Lorne Scots)
 14th Canadian Infantry Brigade 
 1st Battalion, The Kent Regiment
 1st Battalion, The King's Own Rifles of Canada
 1st Battalion, The Midland Regiment (Northumberland and Durham)
 No. 14 Defence Platoon (Lorne Scots)
 15th Canadian Infantry Brigade 
 1st Battalion, Les Fusiliers de Sherbrooke
 1st Battalion, Le Régiment de Montmagny
 1st Battalion, Le Régiment de Québec
 No. 15 Defence Platoon (Lorne Scots)
 Canadian Armoured Corps 
 31st (Alberta) Reconnaissance Battalion 
 Royal Canadian Artillery
 Headquarters, Sixth Divisional Artillery, RCA 
 19th Field Regiment 
 20th Field Regiment 
 21st Field Regiment 
 9th Light Anti-Aircraft Regiment 
 25th Light Anti-Aircraft Battery 
 46th Light Anti-Aircraft Battery 
 48th Light Anti-Aircraft Battery 
 79th Light Anti-Aircraft Battery 
 6th Anti-Tank Regiment 
 33rd Anti-Tank Battery 
 56th Anti-Tank Battery 
 74th Anti-Tank Battery 
 103rd Anti-Tank Battery 
 Corps of Royal Canadian Engineers 
 Headquarters 6th Divisional Engineers, RCE 
 7th Field Park Company, RCE 
 20th Field Company, RCE 
 25th Field Company, RCE 
 26th Field Company, RCE 
 Royal Canadian Corps of Signals 
 Headquarters 6th Divisional Signals RCCS6th Canadian Division at Canadian Soldier, Retrieved 22 November 2007
 Royal Canadian Army Service Corps
6th Divisional Petrol Company, RCASC.

August 1943 at Kiska

 9th Light Anti-Aircraft Regiment, RCA
 19th Field Regiment, RCA
 20th Field Regiment, RCA (shared with the 7th Canadian Infantry Division)
 21st Field Regiment, RCA
 24th Field Regiment, RCA (shared with the 7th Canadian Infantry Division)
 25th Field Regiment, RCA
 13th Canadian Infantry Brigade
 1st Battalion, The Canadian Fusiliers (City of London Regiment)
 1st Battalion, The Winnipeg Grenadiers
 1st Battalion, The Rocky Mountain Rangers
 1st Battalion, Le Régiment de Hull
 24th Field Regiment, RCA
 46th Light AA Battery, RCA
 24th Field Company, RCE
 "C" Company, 1st Battalion, The Saint John Fusiliers (Machine Gun)

November 1943
 No. 6 Defence and Employment Platoon (Lorne Scots)
 31st (Alberta) Reconnaissance Regiment
 15th, 25th, 26th Field Companies, RCE
 13th Canadian Infantry Brigade Group
 24th Field Regiment, RCA
 46th Light AA Battery, RCA
 1st Battalion, The Canadian Fusiliers (City of London Regiment)
 1st Battalion, The Winnipeg Grenadiers
 1st Battalion, The Rocky Mountain Rangers
 1st Battalion, 
 1 Company, 1st Battalion, The Saint John Fusiliers (Machine Gun)
 24th Field Company, RCE
 No. 13 Defence Platoon (Lorne Scots)
 14th Canadian Infantry Brigade Group
 25th Field Regiment, RCA
 48th Light AA Battery, RCA
 1st Battalion, The Winnipeg Light Infantry
 1st Battalion, 
 1st Battalion, The Oxford Rifles
 1st Battalion, The Prince of Wales Rangers (Peterborough Regiment)
 1 Company, 1st Battalion, The Saint John Fusiliers (Machine Gun)
 No. 14 Ground Defence Platoon (Lorne Scots)
 15th Canadian Infantry Brigade Group
 20th Field Regiment, RCA
 25th Light AA Battery, RCA
 1st Battalion, The Prince Albert Volunteers
 1st Battalion, 
 1st Battalion, The Prince Edward Island Highlanders
 1st Battalion, The Royal Rifles of Canada
 No. 15 Ground Defence Platoon (Lorne Scots)
 1 Company, 1st Battalion, The Saint John Fusiliers (Machine Gun)

November 1944
No. 6 Defence and Employment Platoon (Lorne Scots)
 31st (Alberta) Reconnaissance Regiment
 1st Battalion, The Saint John Fusiliers (Machine Gun)
 20th, 24th, 25th Field Regiments, RCA
 22nd Heavy AA Battery (Mobile), RCA
 25th, 46th, 48th Light AA Batteries, RCA
 15th, 24th, 25th, 26th Field Companies, RCE
 14th Canadian Infantry Brigade Group
 1st Battalion, The Winnipeg Light Infantry
 1st Battalion, Les Fusiliers de Sherbrooke
 1st Battalion, The Oxford Rifles
 No. 14 Defence Platoon (Lorne Scots)
 15th Canadian Infantry Brigade Group
 1st Battalion, The Prince Albert Volunteers
 1st Battalion, Les Fusiliers du St-Laurent
 1st Battalion, The Prince Edward Island Highlanders
 No. 15 Defence Platoon (Lorne Scots)
 16th Canadian Infantry Brigade Group
 1st Battalion, The Midland Regiment (Northumberland and Durham)
 1st Battalion, The Royal Rifles of Canada
 1st Battalion, The Prince of Wales Rangers (Peterborough Regiment)

References

Infantry divisions of Canada
Canadian World War II divisions
Military units and formations established in 1942
Aleutian Islands campaign
6
Military units and formations of the British Empire in World War II